Catathyridium lorentzii is a species of sole in the family Achiridae. It was described by Hendrik Weyenbergh in 1877, originally under the genus Achirus. It inhabits the Uruguay and Paraguay rivers.

References

Pleuronectiformes
Fish described in 1877